Wing Chong Luke (February 18, 1925 – May 16, 1965) was a Chinese-American lawyer and politician from Seattle.

Luke served as an assistant attorney general of Washington for the state civil rights division from 1957 to 1962. He was later a member of the Seattle City Council for position 5 from 1962 until his death in 1965 in a plane crash. The Wing Luke Museum of the Asian Pacific American Experience is named in his honor.

The first Asian-American to hold elected office in the state, Luke was cited as an inspiration by Gary Locke, the first Chinese-American governor of Washington.

Early life and education

Family background and upbringing 
Luke was born on February 18, 1925, in a small town near Canton (modern Guangzhou). His grandfather had run a laundry in Seattle, but exclusion laws forced Luke's father to return to China. When Luke was five, his family moved to the United States, but he did not settle in Seattle until 1931, at the age of six. Upon their arrival in Seattle, the family saved to open a modest laundry and grocery store in the University District. Luke was the oldest of six children.

While in school, Luke was often teased for his Chinese origins. However, he eventually became the Roosevelt High School student body president. In 1944, his grades and civic activities earned him one of nine slots, as a high school consultant for the White House Conference on juvenile problems.

Military service 
Only halfway through his senior year of high school, Luke was inducted into the U.S. Army. Initially in the Army Specialized Training Program, he then joined the infantry and field artillery and was acting first sergeant and regimental S-1 sergeant in the 40th division Field Artillery. He served in Guam, Korea, New Guinea, New Britain and the Philippines, where he received the Bronze Star Medal and six combat stars.

Higher education 
Following his service, Luke entered the University of Washington. As in high school, Luke was a prominent leader. He was President of his sophomore class, the U.W. YMCA, the Baptist-Disciples' Student Center, the U.W. Red Cross, U.W. Young Democrats, and the committee chairman of A.S.U.W. Publications. He graduated from the university with a B.A. in political science and public administration. He did graduate work in the same fields at the American University in Washington, D.C. He then attended the UW School of Law to earn an LL.B.

Legal and political career 
Initially in private practice, he soon was appointed the Assistant Attorney General of the State of Washington, in the Civil Rights Division and served in that capacity from 1957 to 1962. In December, 1961 Luke took a leave of absence from his duties to file for position number 5 on the Seattle City Council. Running on the slogan "You are not electing a platform, but a Councilman," Luke maintained a pragmatic position on the issues. Despite having to defend against criticism of "fence sitting," accusations of communism, and racial slurs, 

Luke won the council seat with a landslide of 30,000 votes and was sworn in on March 13, 1962. He became the first Asian American to hold elected office in the Pacific Northwest as well as the first person of color to hold a Seattle City Council seat.

Death and legacy
On May 16, 1965, Luke was killed in a plane crash with two others on Merchant Peak in Snohomish County, while returning from a fishing trip in Okanogan County. The wreckage was not found in the Cascade Mountains for more than three years. 		

Luke is the namesake of multiple institutions. Friends and other supporters of Luke who raised money to search for him started the Wing Luke Memorial Foundation. The money went to the founding of the Wing Luke Museum of the Asian Pacific American Experience in 1966 to fulfill his vision of a place to present the histories and cultures of Asian immigrants and present-day issues of Asian Americans. The museum remains located in Seattle Chinatown-International District. 

In 2013, the United States Department of the Interior designated the Wing Luke Museum as being affiliated with the National Park Service. Rhea Suh, an Assistant Secretary of the Interior, stated "As a first-generation Asian American and a senior appointee of the Obama Administration, I am humbled and inspired by the public service legacy of Wing Luke".

The Seattle school South Van Asselt School was renamed the Wing Luke Elementary School in 1969. In 2015, the Washington state attorney general's office created the Wing Luke Civil Rights Unit to investigate issues related to discrimination and civil rights.

Gary Locke, the first Chinese-American governor of Washington and U.S. Ambassador to China, has cited Luke as an inspiration.

Views 
Luke saw many of his contemporaries forced to live in racialized pockets of Seattle like Beacon Hill (largely Asian Americans) and the Central District (largely African Americans), and felt strongly that the ability to decide where one lived should be a basic right of all citizens. Having firsthand awareness of the effects of racial discrimination, Luke was instrumental in Seattle's passing of an Open Housing Ordinance in 1963 with punitive provisions against racial discrimination in the selling or renting of real estate. 

He also fought for civil rights, Indian fishing rights, urban renewal and historic preservation. Luke was particularly concerned with the preservation of Seattle's Central Waterfront, Pioneer Square, and Pike Place Market. He was affiliated with several community organizations, including the Urban League, Chinese Community Service Organization, Japanese American Citizens League, and the Jackson Street Community Council.

See also
 Keye Luke
 Wing Luke Museum of the Asian Pacific American Experience

References 

1925 births
1965 deaths
Accidental deaths in Washington (state)
American military personnel of Chinese descent
United States Army personnel of World War II
American politicians of Chinese descent
Republic of China (1912–1949) emigrants to the United States
Politicians from Guangdong
Seattle City Council members
Asian-American city council members
Asian-American people in Washington (state) politics
United States Army soldiers
University of Washington College of Arts and Sciences alumni
University of Washington School of Law alumni
Victims of aviation accidents or incidents in 1965
Victims of aviation accidents or incidents in the United States
Washington (state) lawyers